Kakhaber is a Georgian masculine given name and refer to:
Kakhaber Aladashvili, Georgian footballer
Kakhaber Gogichaishvili, Georgian footballer
Kakha Kaladze, Georgian footballer
Kakhaber Tskhadadze, Georgian footballer
Kakhaber Zhvania, Georgian boxer

See also
House of Kakhaberisdze

Georgian masculine given names